The 2020 IIHF World Championship Division III was an international ice hockey tournament run by the International Ice Hockey Federation.

The Group A tournament would have been held in Kockelscheuer, Luxembourg from 19 to 25 April and the Group B tournament in Cape Town, South Africa from 20 to 23 April 2020.

Both tournaments were cancelled on 13 March 2020 due to the COVID-19 pandemic.

Group A tournament

Participants

Match officials
Four referees and seven linesmen are selected for the tournament.

Standings

Results
All times are local (UTC+2).

Group B tournament

Participants

Match officials
Three referees and four linesmen are selected for the tournament.

Standings

Results
All times are local (UTC+2).

References

External links
Group A website
Group B website

2020
Division III
2020 IIHF World Championship Division III
2020 IIHF World Championship Division III
Sports competitions in Cape Town
2020 in Luxembourgian sport
2020 in South African sport
April 2020 sports events in South Africa
April 2020 sports events in Europe
Ice hockey events cancelled due to the COVID-19 pandemic